The Nice Half Marathon is an annual road running competition over the half marathon distance (21.1 km) held in April in the city of Nice, France. It is organised by the Azur Sport Organisation, who hold several races in the region, including the annual French Riviera Marathon.

The men's course record is held by Bernard Kiprop Koech of Kenya, who at 59:57 minutes is the only man to win the race in under an hour. The women's record of 1:08:42 dates back to 2003, when Olympic medallist Isabella Ochichi won the race. 

Launched in 1992, the race reached an international standard around 1995, which coincided with an increase in the number of East African runners entering (and winning) the race. Since 1995 only two non-Kenyans have won the men's race. The most successful athlete of the competition's history is Alina Gherasim of Romania, who took three straight wins from 1997 to 1999. No man has ever won the Nice Half Marathon multiple times.

Past winners
Key:

References

List of winners
Nice Half. Association of Road Racing Statisticians. Retrieved on 2016-06-10.

Half marathons in France
Annual sporting events in France
1992 establishments in France
Recurring events established in 1992
April sporting events
Spring (season) events in France